Tolleson  is a city in Maricopa County, Arizona, United States. According to the U.S. Census Bureau, the population of the city was 7,216 as of the 2020 census, up from 6,545 in 2010.

History
The city was incorporated in 1929 and named after founder W.G. Tolleson.

Geography
Tolleson is located on the western side of the Phoenix metropolitan area. The community lies just south of I-10.

Demographics

As of the 2010 census Tolleson had a population of 6,545. The ethnic and racial makeup of the population was 80.1% Hispanic (72.7% of the total population identifying as of Mexican descent, 1.0% identifying as being of Puerto Rican descent), 11.0% non-Hispanic white, 5.8% non-Hispanic blacks, 1.0% non-Hispanic Native American, 0.9% Asian, 0.2% Pacific Islander, 0.2% non-Hispanic reporting some other race and 4.2% reporting two or more races (only 1.1% of the population was non-Hispanics reporting two or more races, however Hispanicness itself is not treated as something one can be partly).

At the 2000 census, there were 4,974 people, 1,432 households, and 1,151 families living in the city. The racial makeup of the city was 52.2% White, 1.4% Black or African American, 1.2% Native American, 0.5% Asian, 0.2% Pacific Islander, 40.8% from other races, and 3.7% from two or more races.  78.0% of the population were Hispanic or Latino of any race.

Of the 1,432 households 39.3% had children under the age of 18 living with them, 52.7% were married couples living together, 19.8% had a female householder with no husband present, and 19.6% were non-families. 15.9% of households were one person and 7.1% were one person aged 65 or older.  The average household size was 3.47 and the average family size was 3.83.

The age distribution was 32.4% under the age of 18, 10.9% from 18 to 24, 27.4% from 25 to 44, 19.4% from 45 to 64, and 9.8% 65 or older.  The median age was 29 years. For every 100 females, there were 102.8 males.  For every 100 females age 18 and over, there were 100.8 males.

The median household income was $38,773 and the median family income  was $43,894. Males had a median income of $26,934 versus $23,511 for females. The per capita income for the city was $13,747.  About 9.9% of families and 13.7% of the population were below the poverty line, including 19.4% of those under age 18 and 10.9% of those age 65 or over.

Economy
SK Food Group, in a partnership with Phoenix and Tolleson, expanded operations in 2016. Their food processing plant is projected to bring 550 jobs, with an emphasis on helping unemployed youth ages 16–24 who are not attending school and on attracting talent across the Valley.

Top employers
According to Tolleson's 2021 Comprehensive Annual Financial Report, the top employers in the city are:

Notable people
 Merle Keagle, baseball player
 Bob Stump, congressman
 Anna Tovar, state legislator and former mayor of Tolleson

Governmental representation
The city is in Arizona's 7th Congressional District, served by Representative Ruben Gallego, and Arizona's 19th State Legislative District, served by Representatives Mark A. Cardenas and Diego Espinoza and Senator Lupe Contreras, all Democrats.

Education
The city is served by Tolleson Union High School District, Tolleson Elementary School District, Littleton Elementary School District, Union Elementary School District and Fowler Elementary School District.

References

External links
 
 Southwest Valley Chamber of Commerce

Cities in Maricopa County, Arizona
Cities in Arizona
Populated places in the Sonoran Desert
Phoenix metropolitan area
1929 establishments in Arizona